The church of St. Peter in Eastgate, Lincoln is a Grade II listed parish church in Lincoln, England.

History

The original church was built in the 11th century. It was damaged in the English Civil War during the siege of 1643. Between 1776 and 1781 it was replaced. This new building lasted nearly 100 years until a large church was required, and in 1870 the present church was built by the architect Sir Arthur Blomfield. Chancel decoration was added by George Frederick Bodley in 1884.

In 1914 the south aisle was added, by Temple Lushington Moore, paid for by Alfred Shuttleworth, at the same time the Rood Screen was added.

In 1993 the north aisle was altered to provide the Louisa Smith meeting room.

Organ

The organ dates from 1836. Subsequent restorations and enlargements were undertaken by T.H. Nicholson, Hope-Jones, Bishop and Son and Henry Willis. Details of the organ can be found on the National Pipe Organ Register.

Organists

Harry Smith Trevitt 1904 - 1948
Edward Graham Patman FRCO 1961 - 1978

Community
The parish is very active, describing itself as 'progressive' and 'evangelical'.  It has an outreach programme for the Carlton Estate and Bunker's Hill areas. Because of the venue this is known as St Peters in the Pub.  The diocese regards this as a church in its own right.

References

Lincoln
Lincoln
Churches in Lincoln, England
Lincoln
Lincoln
Lincoln